Old Jail may refer to:

In the United States (ordered by state and then city)
 Old Jail (Gordo, Alabama), listed on the National Register of Historic Places (NRHP) in Alabama
 Old Scott County Jail, in Waldron, Arkansas
 Old Hamilton County Jail, listed on the NRHP in Jasper, Florida
 Old Taylor County Jail, listed on the NRHP in Perry, Florida
 Old St. Johns County Jail, listed on the NRHP in St. Augustine, Florida
 Old Jail Museum (Conyers, Georgia), listed on the NRHP in Rockdale County, Georgia
 Quitman County Courthouse and Old Jail, listed on the NRHP in Georgetown, Georgia
 Old Jail (Washington, Georgia), NRHP-listed in Wilkes County
 Old Jail (Muscatine, Iowa), listed on the NRHP in Iowa
 Old St. Helena Parish Jail, listed on the NRHP in Greensburg, Louisiana
 Old Jail (Barnstable, Massachusetts), listed on the NRHP in Massachusetts
 Old Jail Museum (Chambersburg, Pennsylvania), listed on the NRHP in Franklin County, Pennsylvania
 Old Scott County Jail (Huntsville, Tennessee), listed on the NRHP in Huntsville, Tennessee
 Old Fentress County Jail, listed on the NRHP in Jamestown, Tennessee
 Old Jail (Sneedville, Tennessee), listed on the NRHP in Tennessee
 Old Cameron County Jail, listed on the NRHP in Brownsville, Texas

In the United Kingdom
 Old Jail, Biggin Hill, a pub in Biggin Hill, Westerham, Kent, England

See also
 Old Gaol (disambiguation)
 Jails and prisons listed on the National Register of Historic Places
 List of jail and prison museums